Sharpe is a British television drama series starring Sean Bean as Richard Sharpe, a fictional British soldier in the Napoleonic Wars, with Irish actor Daragh O'Malley playing his second in command Patrick Harper. Sharpe and Harper are the heroes of the Sharpe series of novels by Bernard Cornwell; most, though not all, of the episodes are based on the books. Produced by Celtic Films and Picture Palace Films for the ITV network, the series was filmed mainly in Crimea, with recording of other episodes in Turkey, England, Portugal, and Spain. The two final episodes were filmed in Jaipur, India.

The series originally ran from 1993 to 1997. In 2006, ITV premiered Sharpe's Challenge, a two-part adventure loosely based on his time in India, with Sean Bean continuing his role as Sharpe; part one premiered on 23 April, with part two being shown the following night. With more gore than earlier episodes, the show was broadcast by BBC America in September 2006.  Filming of Sharpe's Peril, produced by Celtic Film/Picture Palace, began on 3 March 2008 in India. The first part was broadcast on ITV and UTV on 2 November 2008, with the second part shown a week later, although STV, the holders of the Northern and Central Scottish licensees of ITV, decided not to screen Sharpe's Peril.
Sharpe's Challenge and Sharpe's Peril were broadcast in the US in 2010 as part of PBS's Masterpiece Classic season. The complete series is available on VHS (excluding Sharpe's Challenge and Sharpe's Peril), DVD, Blu-ray, and iTunes. The Blu-ray and iTunes releases have been remastered in HD widescreen from the original filmstrips, with the former format available in a special collector's edition box set.

Plot summary

At the beginning of the series, Richard Sharpe is a sergeant in the 95th Rifles serving in Portugal during the Peninsular War in 1809. When he single-handedly saves the life of General Sir Arthur Wellesley from a group of French cavalrymen, Wellesley gives Sharpe a battlefield commission, appointing him a lieutenant. Sharpe is placed in charge of a detachment of elite "chosen men" of the 95th Rifles. Patrick Harper eventually becomes his best friend and is promoted to sergeant and later sergeant major.

Wellesley and his various spymasters, first Major Michael Hogan, followed by Major Nairn, Major Mungo Monroe and Major General Ross, find Sharpe to be an extremely capable and cunning officer and give him progressively more important tasks. Despite their backing, he has to fight against the strong prejudice of aristocrats (who often owe their army positions to money and social connections rather than to military skill) against an uncouth commoner raised from the ranks. He makes a number of dangerous enemies, such as French Major Pierre Ducos and Colonel Sir Henry Simmerson, and encounters one from his prior service in India, Sergeant Obadiah Hakeswill. Sharpe's successes gain him steady promotion, and by the end of the Napoleonic Wars, at the Battle of Waterloo, he is Lieutenant-Colonel Sharpe.

Along the way, Sharpe has a number of romances. He marries the Spanish guerrilla leader Teresa Moreno, with whom he has a daughter. Teresa is killed by Hakeswill. Sharpe then marries Jane Gibbons, who deserts him, squanders his money, and takes a lover. He finally settles down with Lucille Castineau, a Frenchwoman who passes away some time after Napoleon's final defeat. (However, according to The Starbuck Chronicles, another series of Cornwell books, she outlives Sharpe.)

Casting
Initially, Paul McGann was cast in the title role; however, two weeks into filming of the first episode in Ukraine, McGann injured his knee playing football and was forced to withdraw. When production started again a month later, Sean Bean was given the role because he was the only suitable replacement available at short notice. The first actor cast was Daragh O'Malley as Harper. The character of Rifleman Harris, played by Jason Salkey, did not exist in the books and was created for the television series. The producers wanted a "clever one" and took inspiration from a real soldier who was illiterate but had dictated his own recollections of the war, which were published.

Some actors have played multiple roles in the series. Peter-Hugo Daly portrayed first Sergeant Rodd in Sharpe's Gold and then Bickerstaff, another unruly sergeant who dislikes Sharpe. Julian Fellowes played Major Warren Dunnett in Sharpe's Rifles and also the Prince Regent in Sharpe's Regiment. Tony Haygarth was "Marshal" Pot-au-Feu in Sharpe's Enemy and Sir Willoughby Parfitt in Sharpe's Justice.

List of episodes
The episodes are listed by first airing date.

Cast and crew

Chosen Men
 Sean Bean as Sergeant, later Lieutenant-Colonel, Richard Sharpe (1993–1997, 2006, 2008)
 Daragh O'Malley as Rifleman, later Sergeant and then Sergeant Major, Patrick Harper (1993–1997, 2006, 2008)
 John Tams as Rifleman, later Sergeant, Daniel Hagman (1993–1997) – killed in battle in Sharpe's Waterloo.
 Jason Salkey as Rifleman, later Sergeant, Harris (1993–1997) – killed in battle in Sharpe's Waterloo; not at Waterloo in the novel and presumably survives.
 Lyndon Davies as Rifleman Ben Perkins (1993–1995) – stabbed by O'Rourke in Sharpe's Battle and dies in Harper's arms; survives in the novels.
 Michael Mears as Rifleman Francis Cooper (1993–1995) – disappears after Sharpe's Gold due to a disagreement with the production team; returns to narrate Sharpe the Legend; killed in the novel Sharpe's Rifles but resurrected for several of the later-written books.
 Paul Trussell as Rifleman Isaiah Tongue (1993) – disappears after Sharpe's Eagle and never returns; he may be dead or left the army to go back to England; killed in the novel Sharpe's Gold.

Supporting characters

Production team
 Directed by: Tom Clegg
 Produced by: 
 Writing credits: 
 Novels: Bernard Cornwell
 Screenplays:

See also
 South Essex Regiment
 Over the Hills and Far Away, the theme song of the series
 Over the Hills & Far Away: The Music of Sharpe, companion album

Reception
Cornwell dedicated the 12th book Sharpe's Battle, to Sean Bean and said "When I write Sharpe these days, I hear Sean's voice."

Footnotes

External links

 The official SharpeFilm.net website
 Celtic Films Entertainment, co-producer of the TV dramas
 The Video Diaries of Rifleman Harris
 Trailers, Audio Clips, and Plot Summaries

 
1993 British television series debuts
2008 British television series endings
1990s British drama television series
2000s British drama television series
Cultural depictions of Arthur Wellesley, 1st Duke of Wellington
British historical television series
British military television series
English-language television shows
Films based on historical novels
Films based on military novels
ITV television dramas
Napoleonic Wars films
Napoleonic Wars in fiction
Television shows based on British novels
Television shows produced by Central Independent Television
Television series by ITV Studios
Television series set in the 1800s
Television series set in the 1810s
War television series